College days refers to one's time at college.

It may also refer to:
College Days (1926 film)
College Days (2010 film)